Tugdamme or Dugdammi (Akkadian:  or  ; Ancient Greek:  ,  ;) was a Cimmerian king of the mid-seventh century BC.

Name 
Akkadian  ( or ) and Ancient Greek  are derived from a name in a Cimmerian dialect of the Old Iranian Scythian language.

The Scythologist Askold Ivantchik has instead suggested that the name / was a loanword from an Anatolian language, more specifically Luwian, while also accepting the alternative possibility of a derivation from a variant of the name of the Hurrian deity /.

Historical background
In the 8th and 7th centuries BCE, a significant movement of the nomads of the Eurasian steppe brought the Scythians into Southwest Asia. According to Herodotus, this movement started when the Massagetae or the Issedones migrated westwards, forcing the Scythians to the west across the Araxes and into the Caspian Steppe, from where they displaced the Cimmerians.

Reign 

Around 680 BCE, the Cimmerians separated into two groups, with their bulk having migrated to the west into Anatolia, while a smaller group remained in the east, in the area near the kingdom of Mannai and later migrated into Media.

Tugdammi appears to have succeeded the previous king of the western Cimmerian horde, Teušpa, who was killed in battle near Ḫubušna in Cappadocia against the Assyrian king Esarhaddon in 679 BCE.

Destruction of Phrygia 
Around 675 BCE, the Cimmerians under Tugdammi, in alliance with the Urartian king Rusa II carried out a military campaign to the west, against Muški (Phrygia), Ḫate (the Neo-Hittite state of Melid), and Ḫaliṭu (either the Alizōnes or the Khaldoi); this campaign resulted in the invasion and destruction of the kingdom of Phrygia, whose king Midas II committed suicide. The Cimmerians appear to have consequently partially subdued the Phrygians, and an Assyrian oracular text from the later 670s BCE mentioned the Cimmerians and the Phrygians, who had possibly been subdued by the Cimmerians, as allies against the Assyrians' newly conquered province of Meliddu. A document from 673 BCE records Rusa II as having recruited a large number of Cimmerian mercenaries, and Cimmerian allies of Rusa II probably participated in a military expedition of his in 672 BCE. From 671 to 669 BCE, Cimmerians in service of Rusa II attacked the Assyrian province of Šubria near the Urartian border.

Activities in Anatolia 
At yet unknown dates, the Cimmerians imposed their rule on Cappadocia, invaded Bithynia, Paphlagonia and the Troad, and took the recently founded Greek colony of Sinope, whose initial settlement was destroyed and whose first founder Habrōn was killed in the invasion, and which was later re-founded by the Greek colonists Kōos and Krētinēs. Along with Sinope, the Greek colony of Cyzicus was also destroyed during these invasions and had to be later re-founded.

In the beginning of that decade, the Cimmerians attacked the kingdom of Lydia, whose king Gyges contacted the Neo-Assyrian Empire beginning in 667 BCE. Gyges soon defeated the Cimmerians in 665 BCE without Assyrian help, and he sent Cimmerian soldiers captured while attacking the Lydian countryside as gifts to Esarhaddon's successor, Ashurbanipal.

Threat against Assyria 
Assyrian records in 657 BCE of a "bad omen" for the "Westland" might have referred to either another Cimmerian attack on Lydia, or a conquest by Tugdammi of the western possessions of the Neo-Assyrian Empire, possibly Quwê or somewhere in Syria, following their defeat by Gyges. Thus, the Cimmerians had become a force feared by Esarhaddon, and Tugdammi's successes against Assyria meant that he had become recognised in the ancient Near East as equally powerful as Esarhaddon. This situation remained unchanged throughout the rest of the 650s BCE and the early 640s BCE.

As the result of these Assyrian setbacks, Gyges could not rely on Assyrian support against the Cimmerians and he ended diplomacy with the Neo-Assyrian Empire.

Attack on Lydia 
The Cimmerians under Tugdammi attacked Lydia for a third time in 644 BCE: this time, they defeated the Lydians and captured their capital, Sardis, and Gyges died during this attack. After sacking Sardis, Lygdamis led the Cimmerians into invading the Greek city-states of Ionia and Aeolis on the western coast of Anatolia, which caused the inhabitants of the Batinētis region to flee to the islands of the Aegean Sea, and later Greek writings by Callimachus and Hesychius of Alexandria preserve the record that Lygdamis had destroyed the Artemision of Ephesus during these invasions.

Death 
After this third invasion of Lydia and the attack on the Asiatic Greek cities, around 640 BCE the Cimmerians moved to Cilicia on the north-west border of the Assyrian empire, where Tugdammi allied with Mugallu, the king of Tabal, against Assyria, during which period the Assyrian records called him a "mountain king and an arrogant Gutian (that is a barbarian) who does not know how to fear the gods." However, after facing a revolt against himself, Tugdammi allied with Assyria and acknowledged Assyrian overlordship, and sent tribute to Esarhaddon, to whom he swore an oath. Tugdammi soon broke this oath and attacked the Assyrian Empire again, but he fell ill and died in 640 BCE, and was succeeded by his son Sandakšatru, who attempted to continue Tugdammi's attacks against Assyria but failed just like his father.

References

Sources 

 
 

 

 

7th-century BC rulers
Cimmerian rulers

Kings of the Universe